Mohamed Abdelkarim Mohamed Ismail Al Zarouni (Arabic: محمد عبدالكريم محمد إسماعيل الزرعوني; born 6 February 1972) is an Emirati football referee who has been a full international referee for FIFA.

Al Zarouni became a FIFA referee in 2002. He has served as a referee in competitions including the AFC Champions League and 2014 FIFA World Cup qualifiers, beginning with the match between Bahrain and Qatar.

References 

1972 births
Living people
Emirati football referees